Hazeen Qadri or Hazin Qadri (9 April 1926 – 19 March 1991) was a Punjabi film song lyricist and film screenwriter from Pakistan.

Early life
Qadri was born Bashir Ahmad in a small village 'Raja Tamoli' near Gujranwala, British India on 9 April 1926. He could not complete his education beyond the elementary or primary school due to poverty. As a young man, he was eager to get an opportunity to try his luck in the then newly established Pakistani film industry after 1947. After two years of struggle, he was given a chance to write his first film song by the veteran film producer and director Anwar Kamal Pasha for his upcoming film Do Ansoo (1950). The film turned out to be a 'hit film'.

Career
Qadri's second film was Nath (1952) in which he wrote all the film songs, film script, story and dialogue. This film did not have any commercial success.

Then his breakthrough first hit film song came in Pattan (1955 film):

 Saada Sajra Pyar, Kahay Baar Baar, Keetay Hoey Qarar Bhul Jaen Na Sung by Zubaida Khanum and Inayat Hussain Bhatti, music composed by G.A. Chishti
 
In the same year, Qadri had two more big hit films namely Heer (1955) and Pattay Khan (1955). After that, he had many commercially successful films such as Nooran (1957), Daachi (1964), Hath Jori (1964) and many more hit films followed them.

Popular film songs

Death
Qadri died on 19 March 1991.

References

External links

Hazeen Qadri on Discogs.com website

1926 births
1991 deaths
People from Gujranwala
Pakistani songwriters
Pakistani screenwriters
Punjabi-language writers
Pakistani poets